Bellechasse may refer to:
 
In Quebec, Canada:
 Bellechasse (Lower Canada), an electoral district 1829–1838
 Bellechasse (Province of Canada), an electoral district 1841–1867
 Bellechasse (electoral district), 1867–1996
 Bellechasse (provincial electoral district), 1867–present
 Bellechasse Regional County Municipality, Quebec

See also 
 Bellechasse County (defunct by 2008) 
 Belle Chasse, Louisiana